Pallekele is a suburb of the city of Kandy in Kandy District, Central Province, Sri Lanka. The suburb is home to the Pallekele International Cricket Stadium, the Trinity College Rugby Stadium, the Sri Lanka International Buddhist Academy (SIBA) and the PALK Seismic Station.

Pallekele International Cricket Stadium

PICS, the third largest cricket stadium in Sri Lanka located in nearby Balagolla, is named after Pallekele. At the moment it is frequently hosting international matches. It hosted 3 matches of the 2011 ICC Cricket World Cup, 9 matches of the 2012 ICC World Twenty20 and a few Sri Lanka Premier League matches in 2012. Sri Lankan fast bowler Suranga Lakmal got Chris Gayle out for an LBW with the first ever international cricket delivery at the stadium.

References

External links
 Sri Lanka International Buddhist Academy

Populated places in Sri Lanka
Suburbs of Kandy